A Hundred Thousand in Fresh Notes is the third and final studio album from the British duo Wax, released in 1989. The majority of the album was produced by Peter Collins, with four tracks produced by members Andrew Gold and Graham Gouldman.

"Wherever You Are" was released as the album's lead single, however it failed to generate commercial success in the UK or Europe. The second and final single, "Anchors Aweigh", reached No. 95 in the UK and remained in the charts for two weeks. After the album failed to achieve major commercial success, Gold and Gouldman disbanded and moved on to separate projects.

Reception
Upon release, Newcastle Evening Chronicle commented: "Gouldman and Gold team up again and get off to a fine start with the melodic yet rhythmic "Anchors Aweigh". Obviously a lot of thought and care has gone into this album, from composing to performing and producing."

Track listing

Personnel

Wax
Andrew Gold - vocals, keyboards, guitars, drum programming, backing vocals, percussion
Graham Gouldman - vocals, guitars, bass guitar, backing vocals, percussion

Additional personnel
 Gary Maughn - Fairlight synthesizer
 Dave Stuart - additional keyboards
 Scott Handy - saxophone
 Judd Lander - bagpipes
 Steve Ferrara - drums
 Chris Thompson, Miriam Stockley - backing vocals
 Mr. Magic - rap
 John Cameron - string arrangement, conductor

Production
 Peter Collins - producer (tracks 1-3, 5-6, 9-10)
 Andrew Gold - producer (tracks 4, 7-8), engineer (tracks 4, 7-8, 10)
 Graham Gouldman - producer (tracks 4, 7-8, 10)
 Ian Taylor - engineer (tracks 1-3, 5-6, 9-10)

Other
 Anthony May - photography
 Storm Thorgerson, Colin Chambers - cover
 Nexus - artwork, graphics

References

1989 albums
Wax (British band) albums
RCA Records albums
Albums produced by Peter Collins (record producer)
Albums produced by Andrew Gold
Albums produced by Graham Gouldman